Taurasia may refer to:

 Taurasia, a genus of gastropods
 Taurasia, the ancient capital of Taurini, nearby modern Turin in Northern Italy
 Taurasia (or Taurasia Cisauna) – an ancient city of Samnites, northeast of Benevento in Southern Italy